The Nine Network (stylised 9Network, commonly known as Channel Nine or simply Nine) is an Australian commercial free-to-air television network. It is owned by parent company Nine Entertainment and is one of five main free-to-air television networks in Australia.

From 2017 to 2021, the network's slogan was "We Are the One". Since 2021, the network has changed its slogan back to the iconic Golden Era slogan "Still the One".

As of 2022, the Nine Network is the second-rated television network in Australia, behind the Seven Network, and ahead of the ABC TV, Network 10 and SBS.

History

Origins
The Nine Network's first broadcasting station was launched in Sydney, New South Wales, as TCN-9 on 16 September 1956 by The Daily Telegraph owner Frank Packer.

John Godson introduced the station and former advertising executive Bruce Gyngell presented the first programme, This Is Television (so becoming the first person to appear on Australian television). Later that year, GTV-9 in Melbourne commenced transmissions to broadcast the 1956 Summer Olympics, later forming the National Television Network alongside QTQ-9 in Brisbane in 1959 and NWS-9 in Adelaide, the basis of the current Nine Network, in 1959. Before its formation, TCN-9 was then affiliated with HSV-7 (because alongside the Seven Network, they were both Australia's first television stations, having opened in 1956, and GTV-9's sister affiliate was ATN-7.

The network, by 1967, had begun calling itself the National Nine Network, and became simply the Nine Network Australia in 1987. Kerry Packer inherited the company after his father's death in 1974. Before the official conversion to colour on 1 March 1975, it was the first Australian television station to regularly screen programmes in colour with the first program to use it premiering in 1971, the very year NTD-8 in Darwin commenced.

The New South Wales Rugby Football League  grand final of 1967 became the first football grand final of any code to be televised live nationally. The Nine Network paid $5,000 to attain the broadcasting rights.

Nine Network station STW-9 Perth, which opened in 1965, became owned-and-operated station when Alan Bond purchased the network for one billion dollars in 1987, a deal that became effective after government approvals in 1988. However, in 1989, Bond Media sold the station to Sunraysia Television for A$95 million, due to the federal cross-media ownership laws which restricted the level of national reach for media owners. Nine, which then also included Channel 9 in Brisbane, fell back into the hands of Kerry Packer after Alan Bond's bankruptcy in 1992.

In 2011, GTV 9 Melbourne moved from 22 Bendigo Street, Richmond, to 717 Bourke Street, Docklands. 22 Bendigo Street started out as the Wertheim Piano Factory, then became the Heinz Soup Factory, then GTV9. The building in Bendigo Street still stands, now as luxury apartments.

The "Golden Era" (1977–2006)

Nine began using the slogan "Let Us Be The One" (based on The Carpenters' song, later used by ABC in the United States) in 1977 and became the number-one free-to-air network in Australia; its National Nine News became the most-watched news service. In 1978, Nine switched its slogan to "Still the One" (modelled on the campaign used by ABC in the United States and using the Orleans song Still the One), which lasted until a decline in ratings in January 2006. During the 1980s, Nine's ratings peaked. From 1999 to 2001, the network began losing ground to the Seven network in news and entertainment, but received a boost after the coverage of the 11 September attacks in 2001. By 1991, the network was re-branded to its current branding. The death of CEO Kerry Packer in 2005 triggered more problems for the network. Digital terrestrial television was introduced on 1 January 2001.

Nine loses to Seven (2006–2008)

Nine stayed strong throughout 2003–04, winning 77 out of 80 ratings weeks across those two years (with Network Ten claiming the other three weeks), but was hit hard when Seven introduced a new line-up in 2005, though Nine finished ahead of Seven that year. Meanwhile, National Nine News was overtaken by Seven News for the first time ever, while Today was beaten by Seven's fledgling Sunrise program. In 2006, Nine continued on its downward trend, losing most news weeks to Seven News and just winning the year thanks to its coverage of the 2006 Commonwealth Games. To try to revitalise the network in its 50th anniversary, Nine adopted a new, but critically received, logo that removed the nine dots, which had been part of the network's identity since 1969. In May 2007, Nine partially reintroduced the Nine dots, which resulted in the square logo changing into a three-dimensional (3D) cube that rotates, with the dots visible on every second side of the cube.

After a period of declining ratings, David Gyngell returned to the job of chief executive officer  in October 2007, succeeding Eddie McGuire.

In 2007, despite several hits, Seven won the whole year by a significant margin. The Seven Network had won 38 weeks, whereas the Nine Network only won two.

The Network expanded into Northern NSW with the acquisition on NBN Television in May 2007. However, NBN was retained as an independent Nine affiliate following the acquisition. Deborah Wright who had been doing various roles for the station was promoted to CEO.

Expanding digital services (2008–2014)

In 2008, as part of a major relaunch, the network dropped the blue box, and reinstated its nine dots in its logo, with a 3D look. After losing viewers to Seven News, Nine relaunched its news service as Nine News, which managed to win more weeks over Seven in the first half of 2008. Nine also launched a break-out hit, Underbelly, which attracted over 2.5 million viewers in its first season. Nine tried to attract younger demographics, so while Seven went on to win the ratings year in total people, Nine was rated the number one network in the key 18–49 and 25–54 demographics.

In March 2008, the Nine Network launched a high-definition channel called Nine HD on channel 90 until 2010.

In 2009, Nine started relatively strongly due to the top-rating Australian drama Underbelly: A Tale of Two Cities and the Twenty20 Cricket series until Nine lost the rights in 2018 but could not hold its audience after Network Ten's MasterChef Australia became a hit. Nine became inconsistent with scheduling and removal of programmes. Nine also launched a number of reality shows, including Ladette to Lady, Wipeout Australia, HomeMADE, Australia's Perfect Couple, and The Apprentice Australia, in the hope of achieving the same success other networks had with the genre. All the new formats underperformed in the ratings and did not help the network establish any stable local content. Nine also expanded its news strand with the reintroduction of a late-night bulletin (for its owned-and-operated stations), an extended morning bulletin and weekend editions of Today. The flagship 6:00 pm state bulletins continued to fall in the ratings, though its Melbourne bulletin remained competitive, being the only market to win any weeks against Seven News.

In August 2009, Nine launched its own digital multi-channel called GO! on Channel 99, primarily aimed at a younger demographic. The shares from GO! contributed to Nine's weekly shares and allowed it to enjoy several weeks of weekly ratings wins. In September, the network took on a new slogan, "Welcome Home", and revamped its graphic package. With the resurgence of Nine News, growth of Today, stabilisation of 60 Minutes and a new programme line-up consisting of Hey Hey It's Saturday, Underbelly and Sea Patrol, Nine enjoyed more ratings success.

In 2010, Nine obtained the rights to exclusive coverage of the Sydney New Year's Eve fireworks. GO! won the year in digital shares only. On 26 September 2010, Nine launched their third digital channel GEM (an acronym of General Entertainment and Movies) on Channel 90. In 2011, the Nine Network announced a new "Home of Comedy" line-up with comedy shows such as Two and a Half Men, The Big Bang Theory, and other American sitcoms, along with the launch of a live comedy show Ben Elton Live From Planet Earth, which was cancelled after only three episodes due to low ratings. Nine also brought back This Is Your Life with Eddie McGuire as host, although the series was cancelled after airing four episodes. The Nine Network had success in the ratings in the second half of 2011 with The Block, Underbelly: Razor, and The Celebrity Apprentice Australia. The highly anticipated return of a revamped ninth season of Two and a Half Men proved a huge success for the network, generating 2.3 million viewers and dominating the week as top program. The return of new episodes of the popular sitcom The Big Bang Theory was also a huge success for the network, scoring high figures consistently week after week and dominating the evening as top program. Despite this, the Nine Network finished in second place in the ratings again in 2011 on 19.6%, behind the Seven Network (23.1%) and ahead of the Network Ten (15.9%), ABC TV (12.2%) and SBS (4.6%).

On 24 November 2011, the Nine Network announced the line-up for 2012, with a focus on reality programs, including an Australian version of The Voice, the return of Big Brother, Excess Baggage, and The Celebrity Apprentice Australia. The Nine Network also aired coverage of the 2012 Summer Olympics in London. A new morning show, Mornings, replaced the departure of Kerri-Anne Kennerley's self-titled show, after nine years on air. The program, now called Today Extra, is hosted by Sylvia Jeffreys and David Campbell.

On 26 March 2012, the Nine Network launched Extra, a new channel aimed at delivering home shopping, brand funded, religious, community, educational and multi-cultural programming content created by advertisers.

It was reported on 31 May 2012 that the Australian telecommunications company Telstra and WIN Television Network CEO, Bruce Gordon, are considering making a takeover bid for Nine Entertainment. The network currently is trying to fight off administration as it deals with a debt exceeding A$3.3 billion.

It was reported on 3 June 2013 that the Nine Network would immediately purchase Adelaide affiliate NWS-9 from the WIN Corporation as part of a deal to secure international cricket television rights. On 3 July 2013, it was reported that Nine would exercise an option to also buy STW-9 from WIN Corporation. Both purchases have resulted in these stations being, once again, O&O stations of the network for the first time since the 1980s.

As of 10 December 2013, Nine no longer broadcasts on analogue TV and is now only available through digital TV or digital set-top box.

On 27 January 2014, the Nine Network have stopped using the Supertext logo and have switched to their own Closed Captioning logo.

A new era in television (2014-2019) 

Nine relaunched 9HD, in November 2015, an HD simulcast of their primary channel, on channel 90 and launched new lifestyle channel 9Life on channel 94. In addition to the relaunch of 9HD, GEM (renamed 9Gem) was reduced to standard definition and moved to channel 92 and GO! (renamed 9Go!) was moved to channel 93. On 16 December 2015, Nine also changed its on-air theme for a continuous design across all of its channels with the Nine News/9news.com.au branding to remain unchanged. This included a new look for program listings, program advertisements and promos. Additionally in November 2015, Hugh Marks replaced David Gyngell as CEO.

On 27 January 2016, Nine's online catch-up video on-demand service 9Jumpin was retired and replaced by 9Now. 9Now offers a range of content larger than 9Jumpin and also offers a live streaming service for Nine's multicast channels. Live streaming for Nine was launched on the same day, with streaming for 9Gem, 9Go! and 9Life launched on 19 May 2016. Following the launch of 9Now, the WIN Corporation, owner of Nine affiliate WIN Television, filed a lawsuit against Nine Entertainment Co., claiming that live streaming into regional areas breaches their affiliation agreement. The case was later dismissed on 28 April 2016 with Justice Hammerschlag of the NSW Supreme Court stating that, "I have concluded that live streaming is not broadcasting within the meaning of the PSA (program supply agreement), and that Nine is under no express or implied obligation not to do it."

Following their victory in the 9Now court case, Nine Entertainment Co. announced on 29 April 2016 that it had signed a $500 million five year affiliation deal with Southern Cross Austereo, the then-primary regional affiliate of Network 10. On 1 July 2016, WIN Television lost its Nine affiliate status to Southern Cross, which had Nine's metropolitan branding introduced across its now Nine-branded television assets. Nine later secured an affiliate deal with Mildura Digital Television, a joint venture between WIN and Prime Media Group, on 28 June 2016 to supply Nine content to the Mildura and Sunraysia area due to WIN switching affiliation to Network Ten. Nine finalised supply deals with WIN for South Australia and Griffith on 29 June 2016 after long negotiations, with a deal for Tasmanian joint venture TDT secured the following day after long negotiations. A supply deal for Western Australia joint venture West Digital Television was not secured before the 1 July 2016 deadline, but a deal was later finalised on 2 July 2016 with programming resuming that night.
Also after 10 years as an independent affiliate, NBN Television was finally folded in to the Nine Network with the NBN logo being retired on air after 54 years. However, despite being a Nine O&O, NBN News remains as an independent news bulletin, despite adopting the full Nine News on air look.

In June 2018, it was announced that Nine would enter into a joint venture with Australian News Channel (ANC) to create Your Money, a business news channel that was replaced the Sky News Business Channel on Foxtel channel 601 and also available free-to-air through Nine on channel 95, replacing Extra. However, it closed on 17 May 2019 due to lack of advertising and poor ratings.

Return to the top (2019–2021)

After 12 years, the Nine Network won the 2019 ratings year for the first time since 2006. The Seven Network had won every ratings year between 2007 and 2018 inclusive, however, due to lower than expected ratings, and a launch of new programs not performing as hoped, this allowed Nine to regain lost ground during the most competitive times of the ratings period (most notably, Nine's Married At First Sight performed above expectations, and consistently beat My Kitchen Rules which saw its lowest figures on record) which resulted in Nine's first win in the first quarter since 2009.

Nine's yearly share for 2019 concluded at 29.4%, a 2.1% increase from 2018 (27.3%) compared to Seven's 29.0%, a 1.7% decline from 2018 (30.7%)

In 2020, despite drastic and last minute changes to most network's programming schedules in light of the COVID–19 pandemic the Nine Network has managed to retain the number one lead by a considerable margin.

On 5 April 2020, Nine launched 9Rush as a joint venture with Discovery Inc., which features action and adventure-themed reality series targeting a young adult male audience.
On 1 October 2020, the Nine Network re-launched Extra, after 2 years being discontinued, thanks to Your Money.

On 21 November 2020, Nine moved their Sydney studios to North Sydney.

In March 2021, it was reported that the network had suffered a suspected ransomware attack using MedusaLocker during live broadcast. The hack disrupted its programming in Sydney and Darwin. Australia's parliament and Taylors Wines was also subject to a cyberattack around the same time, although it is unclear if the incidents are connected.

On 12 March 2021, Nine announced that it would return to WIN Television as its regional affiliate in most markets beginning on 1 July 2021, in a deal that will last at least seven years. SCA subsequently announced that it would return to Network 10, effectively reversing their 2016 realignment. Under  the agreement, WIN will pay half of its regional advertising revenue to Nine Entertainment Co., and provide advertising time for Nine's properties on its radio and television outlets. WIN will also provide advertising sales services for Nine's O&O stations NBN and NTD (with the former succeeding a similar agreement it had with SCA). Nine CEO Hugh Marks explained that "while our relationship with Southern Cross has been strong over the last five years, the opportunities presented by the WIN Network to both extend the reach of Nine's premium content into more regional markets under one agreement, and to work cooperatively with them on a national and local news operation, mean this is the right time for us to return to WIN."

Nine Network programming

Australian-based programs

The Nine Network broadcasts annual events such as ARIA Music Awards and Carols by Candlelight. The Nine Network's News and Current Affairs division, presents several bulletins and the breakfast TV program Today.

The network presents a range of entertainment programming of various genre's from Australian and overseas sources.

Nine's current Australian programming line-up include: Getaway, The AFL Sunday Footy Show, Footy Classified, 100% Footy, The NRL Sunday Footy Show, Sports Sunday, Cross Court, RBT, The Block, Millionaire Hot Seat, 20 to 1, Australian Ninja Warrior, Travel Guides, Lego Masters, Married at First Sight, The Hundred with Andy Lee, Parental Guidance, Snackmasters, Love Island Australia, Taronga: Who's Who in the Zoo, South Aussie With Cosi, (later moved to Seven Network in 2022) and Accidental Heroes.

International programs

Current US programming that airs on Nine and its digital multichannels are sourced from Nine's deals Roadshow Entertainment and Cartoon Network Studios / Warner Bros. Television Distribution and Warner Bros. Entertainment Inc (long running), StudioCanal / Sony Pictures Television International and Sony Pictures Animation, NBCUniversal Global Distribution and Illumination Entertainment / DreamWorks Pictures and DreamWorks Animation (long running), Paramount Global Content Distribution / MTV Networks and Nickelodeon International, Miramax, 20th Century Studios / Regency Enterprises, and Metro-Goldwyn-Mayer Television International.

The network's flagship overseas program was the popular sitcoms The Big Bang Theory (later moved to Network 10 as reruns in 2020) and Young Sheldon. Other American programs on Nine include medical drama Chicago Med, documentary series The First 48 and crime dramas Law & Order True Crime and Law & Order: Organized Crime.  British programs on Nine include the U.K. game shows Pointless and Tipping Point. Sony Pictures daytime soap operas on 9Gem include Days of Our Lives and The Young and The Restless. Extra use to air on Nine up until its 26th season and the cancelled Lethal Weapon. From 2008  until 2021 and 2013 respectively, Nine also broadcast the U.S. daytime talk shows The Ellen DeGeneres Show and The View.

Since 2015, the network that has cuts ties with Warner Bros. Television, losing the network's TV rights to Arrow, Gotham, Mom and Two Broke Girls, among many others.

On 11 March 2015, Nine would create a new acquired programming deal with Nickelodeon, granting the network programming rights which they currently share with 10 and ABC.

On 2 April 2017, Nine would create a new acquired programming deal with NBCUniversal, granting the network programming rights which they currently share with Seven.

On 22 February 2020, DreamWorks Animation are now returned to Nine Network after 8 years was shared with Network 10 and Seven Network because NBCUniversal is ultimately reunited with DreamWorks after 15 years was separated each other (starting with DreamWorks 25 Anniversary) and also Network 10 was a part of Paramount Australia & New Zealand and therefore had access to programming from Comedy Central, MTV and Nickelodeon, along with Channel 5 in the United Kingdom and Telefe in Argentina. Since the ViacomCBS merger, Nine, 10, and ABC continues to share their Paramount programs with each other after last year was absence on 10 since that Disney was taken over on 9Go! from 2019 to 2020.

Share overseas programs
Sharing programs is currently a new rule for all the networks after a very, very long absence which have their own programs from the 1990s to 2014. All the networks can now share the programs again with each networks of televisions and films, including splitting up the different seasons of the same television series or franchise. Also some television brands can split the different seasons of the same television series by aired on both networks.

Share US programming that airs on Nine and Seven and its digital multichannels are sourced from Nine and Seven's deals NBCUniversal Global Distribution, Warner Bros. Television Distribution / Warner Bros. Entertainment Inc, StudioCanal / Sony Pictures Television International and Sony Pictures Animation, 20th Century Studios / Regency Enterprises.

Share US programming that airs on Nine and 10 and its digital multichannels are sourced from Nine and 10's deals Paramount Global Content Distribution / MTV Networks and Nickelodeon International (Nickelodeon shows only), DreamWorks Pictures (selected films only), Miramax, Roadshow Entertainment / Warner Bros. Television Distribution and Warner Bros. Entertainment Inc.

Share US programming that airs on Nine and ABC and its digital multichannels are sourced from Nine and ABC's deals Paramount Global Content Distribution / Nickelodeon International (Nickelodeon shows only), NBCUniversal Global Distribution / DreamWorks Animation, Cartoon Network Studios / Warner Bros. Television Distribution, StudioCanal / Sony Pictures Television International.

Former programs 
The network formerly broadcast catalogue movie and television titles from Disney from 2018 to 2020. Disney now belong to Seven Network and Disney+, Seven and Disney+ revived Disney broadcast rights.

News and popular affairs

History 

The Nine Network's news service is Nine News (previously National Nine News). For many decades, it was the top-rating news service nationally, but was over taken in the mid 2000s by rival network Seven. Nine regained its news dominance (nationally) at the conclusion of the 2013 ratings year.

Nine produces several news bulletins and programmes, including Today, Today Extra, Weekend Today, Nine News: Early Edition, Nine Morning News, Nine Afternoon News, Nine News: First at Five, local nightly editions of Nine News as well as regional news bulletins for Northern New South Wales and the Gold Coast under the name NBN News and since March 2020, national late night bulletins titled Nine News Late

The news service also produces A Current Affair which programs every weekday, Under Investigation an investigative current affairs show which programs every Monday, and 60 Minutes, which programs every Sunday night. Until mid 2018 during weekday overnights and Sunday mornings, Nine rebroadcast American television network ABC's news and current affairs programme Good Morning America.

From 2008, major expansion saw Today broadcast on Saturday and Sunday, too, the weekday version running from 05:30 until 09:00 weekdays, the launch of the Nine Early News, the axing of the Sunday program, National Nine News becoming Nine News after poor ratings, losing to Seven News, Nine Late News was launched then renamed as Nightline and the 11 am bulletin be renamed as Nine's Morning News, running from 11:00 until 12:00 weekdays (now a half-hour news bulletin from 2015 onwards).

Meanwhile, several additions have been made to Nine News teams around the country, as well as the acquisition of more reporters by A Current Affair and also state-based Today reporters (plus a Weekend Today weather presenter).

In 2014, Nine News website moved from its ninemsn website to a brand-only website become 9news.com.au, which are still in use to this day.

Nine has posted journalists overseas to cover major European stories following the closure of its European bureau in late 2008, with the last European correspondent, James Talia, being redesignated to his former role as a senior Melbourne Nine News journalist. Reporters including Simon Bouda, Allison Langdon, Chloe Bugelly, Eddie Blake, Tim Arvier, and Brett McLeod have all been on projects for Nine News bulletins in Greece, the UK, France, South Africa, Thailand, and the Czech Republic.

Starting in the 1980s, the Eyewitness News theme music (adapted from the film Cool Hand Luke) has been the official Nine News theme. First adopted in the Sydney and Melbourne stations and later in Perth and Adelaide, it is now played nationwide in all 7 O&O stations in their respective newscasts. Until 2021, NBN News used its own theme music, from November 2021, it started using the Nine News theme music. The theme is also used by Nine’s radio division Nine Radio.

Sport

Channel Nine broadcasts all sporting events under the Wide World of Sports brand. The flagship sports of the brand are cricket until Nine lost the rights in 2018, Australian Open Tennis, National Rugby League (NRL), and formerly Australian Football League (AFL), until Nine lost the rights in 2006, and Super League while it existed. NRL games are broadcast in prime time on Nine in New South Wales, Australian Capital Territory, Northern Territory and Queensland on Friday nights; however prime time NRL is shown at same time on multi-channel 9Gem in Victoria, South Australia, Western Australia, and Tasmania.

Nine's other popular recurring sporting events include the State of Origin series, Gillette Twenty20 until Nine lost the rights in 2018, Gillette Series Cricket until Nine lost the rights in 2018, and Test cricket until Nine lost the rights in 2018. and formerly the Australian Swimming Championships until Nine lost the rights in 2009. As well as this, the Nine Network also had broadcast rights for the 2006 Commonwealth Games, and, in joint partnership with subscription television provider Foxtel, had broadcast rights for the 2010 Winter Olympics and the 2012 Summer Olympics. In February 2023, Nine regained the rights to the Olympics from the 2024 Summer Olympics through to the 2032 Summer Olympics in Brisbane.

On 26 May 2010, Nine became the first free-to-air television channel in Australia to broadcast in 3D. The broadcast was the 2010 State of Origin series.

In 2017 Nine's Wide World of Sports became the home of netball. The network broadcasts two live matches every Saturday Night of the new Suncorp Super Netball league. They also televise every Australian Diamonds Fixture and the Constellation Cup. All netball is live on 9Gem.

In 2018, Nine acquired the rights to the Australian Open from 2020 through 2024.

Availability

The Nine Network is simulcast in standard and high definition digital. Nine's core programming is fibre-fed out of GTV Melbourne to its sister stations and affiliates, with TCN Sydney providing national news and current affairs programming. The current affairs programming was originally done at GTV before moving to TCN in 2012. The receiving stations and affiliates then insert their own localised news and advertising which is then broadcast in metropolitan areas and Northern NSW via owned-and-operated stations, including TCN Sydney, GTV Melbourne, QTQ Brisbane, NWS Adelaide, STW Perth, NTD Darwin and NBN Northern New South Wales. Nine Network programming is also carried into the rest of regional Australia by affiliate networks: WIN Television, Southern Cross GTS/BKN and Imparja Television. Nine is also broadcast via satellite and cable on Foxtel.

In 2013, the Nine Network switched their captioning provider from Red Bee Media to Ai-Media.

Nine Network affiliates

9HD

The Nine Network originally launched a high definition simulcast of their main channel on channel 90 on 1 January 2001 alongside the introduction of digital terrestrial television in Australia. The simulcast was relaunched as a breakaway multichannel 9HD on 17 March 2008 but was reverted to a simulcast on 3 August 2009 and was later replaced by GEM (now 9Gem) on 26 September 2010. 9HD was revived as a 1080i HD simulcast of Nine on 26 November 2015 on channel 90, bumping 9Gem to SD on channel 92.

9Now

9Now is a video on demand, catch up TV service run by the Nine Network. The service became available on 27 January 2016, replacing Nine's previous service 9Jumpin. 9Now also offers online live streaming for Channel 9, 9Gem, 9Go!, 9Life and 9Rush.

The Olympic news on Today and Nine News don't broadcast live streaming due to the IOC rights being with rival Seven. Instead, it replaces the message board until Olympic news finishes and returning to normal programming.

Logo and corporate identity

The Nine Network logo, which consists of a numeral "9" beside nine dots arranged in a 3x3 grid, is one of the most recognisable logos in Australia.

In 1997, the dots were changed to spheres. The spheres returned to dots as a new on-air identity package was created by Velvet mediendesign in 2001.

This logo was redesigned by Velvet Mediendesign on 1 January 2001, with the introduction of digital TV in Australia and new graphics.

On 1 September 2002, the dots were changed back to spheres from the 1997 logo as well as the numeral becoming 3D for their "7 colours for 7 days" presentation package.

On 30 January 2006, the network and its affiliates relaunched their logos to coincide with Nine's 50th anniversary.

A numeral nine was reworked with a few rounded corners eliminated in process. This logo would use a blue square featuring the numeral altered, which saw the removal of the nine dots again. The graphics package used during that time was designed by Bruce Dunlop Associates.

Later on 15 January 2007 the blue square became solid, and in May they partially relaunched the nine dots, which are visible on every second surface of the box. This logo continued to be used in Perth and Adelaide stations until March 2010, when they reinstated the nine-dots logo.

On 14 January 2008, Nine completely reinstated the nine dots logo, but with a different design. The slogan used with this logo was "we♥TV", which had also been used in December 2007 with the previous logo. This time, the dots are now a bit bigger, like the 1969 logo and the numeral 9 from the previous 2006 logo would continue.

This logo would first be used in Sydney, Melbourne, Brisbane and Darwin markets but the logo would not be used in both Perth and Adelaide markets, until March 2010, due to being owned by WIN Corporation at the same time.

As a part of a major relaunch, the entire logo became 3D on the same day as part of a short-lived rebrand. The nine dots are represented by translucent 3D discs during that year. The music used throughout the network's ID's and promotions was "Smile"' by The Supernaturals, released in 1997. This logo would only be used in 4 metropolitan markets.

On 1 February 2009, the dots are once again 2D as part of a short-lived rebrand, which lasted until 26 September.

On 27 September, the dots are changed to spheres from the 1997 logo yet again when the network's original slogan "Welcome Home" was launched. It also began to re-use the iconic "Still The One" theme tune from 1992 in one of the ID's. The dots is smaller, like the previous 2001 logo and in March 2010, the dots were reinstated in both Perth and Adelaide markets.

Slogans
 Summer 1971/1972: Have a Happy Summer (GTV-9 only)
 1972: Get the Channel 9 Feeling!
 1973: This is the Place to Be in '73
 Winter 1974: Come Home to Us This Winter (GTV-9 only)
 1975–1976: Living Color
 1977: Let Us Be The One (previously used by American Broadcasting Company in 1976)
 1978, 1980 – December 2006, 7 November 2021 — present: Still The One (also used by the American Broadcasting Company in 1977 and 1979, WIN Television from 1989 to December 2006, NBN Television from 1994 to December 2006 and GMV6, BTV6, VTV and TasTV in the 1990s)
 1979 – 31 May 2006: This is Channel 9
 1979: We're The One (previously used by American Broadcasting Company in 1978)
 1980: The National Nine Network, First in Australia
 16 September 1981: 25 Years of Television.
 1982: Number One For Me. (GTV-9 / TCN-9 only)
 1983: Come On Along (previously used by American Broadcasting Company in 1982 and TNT-9 only)
 1985: Now is the Time, Channel Nine is the Place (also used by American Broadcasting Company in 1982) (STW-9 only)
 1985: Nine's For You (QTQ-9 only)
 1986: You'll Love It (previously used by American Broadcasting Company in 1985) (GTV-9 / TCN-9, QTQ-9 / NWS-9 only)
 1995: I am... We are Channel Nine People  (previously used by CBS I am CBS Everyday People in 1994)
 1996: Celebrating 40 Years of Television, This is Channel Nine
 1999–2000: New Millennium Television
 Summer 2004/05: Feel Good Summer
 1 June 2006 – 30 November 2007: Channel Nine (also used at the end of promotions from 15 January 2007 to 13 January 2008)
 1 December 2007 – 31 January 2009: we♥TV
 1 February – 27 September 2009: Choose Nine
 27 September 2009 – 23 December 2017: Welcome Home (previously used by CBS from 1996 to 1999)
 2014–present: Love This City (QTQ-9 only)
 16 September 2016: Celebrating 60 Years of Television, Happy Birthday, Channel Nine
 October 2016 – present: We Lo♥e It (NBN only)
 24 December 2017 – 7 November 2021: We Are The One

Incidents

In March 2021, Thomas Sewell, leader of a neo-Nazi group, and an associate who filmed the incident, went to the Channel 9 Melbourne studios and asked to speak to news staff, before attacking a security guard who was trying to escort him out. Sewell was charged with affray, recklessly causing injury and assault.

See also

 List of Australian television series
 9HD
 9Gem
 9Go!
 9Life
 9Rush
 Extra

Notes

References

Further reading

External links

 
Television channels and stations established in 1956
1956 establishments in Australia
Television networks in Australia
English-language television stations in Australia